Elias Mastokangas (born 1 February 2001) is a Finnish football player who plays as midfielder for Veikkausliiga club Inter Turku.

Career
Mastokangas was loaned out on 2 May 2018 to KaaPo for the rest of 2018, the club he also played for as a youth player.

References

External links
 

2001 births
Living people
Finnish footballers
Finland youth international footballers
Finland under-21 international footballers
Association football midfielders
FC Inter Turku players
Kaarinan Pojat players
IFK Mariehamn players
Veikkausliiga players
Kakkonen players
Finnish people of Greek descent